Dhunat Govt. N.U. Pilot Model High School is a secondary school in Dhunat Upazila,Bogra,Bangladesh Established in 1941. it's a sentral High School in Dhunat Upazila. More than 1200 student studying here.
The Principal: Md. Masiur Rahman
Vice Principal: Md. Tofis Rahman.
VP of DHS: Abu Sufian Piyash   it was also known as Dhunat Boys School before it became co-educational.

References

Schools in Bogra District
Educational institutions established in 1941
1941 establishments in India